2016 Istanbul bombing may refer to:

January 2016 Istanbul bombing
March 2016 Istanbul bombing
June 2016 Istanbul bombing
2016 Istanbul Atatürk Airport attack
December 2016 Istanbul bombings